Phallus in Wonderland is a film by American heavy metal band Gwar, their first attempt at a commercially released, long-form film. The video was nominated for a Grammy in 1993 (which they lost to Annie Lennox for Diva, as mock-mentioned in the 1994 song "Jack the World").

Plot
The film opens with a young Gwar fan on a skateboard, who is shocked to learn of the recent theft of front man Oderus Urungus' "Cuttlefish of Cthulhu" (or penis). The fan is then abducted by GWAR via a giant intercontinental fishing hook, and is taken to Gwar's Antarctic stronghold where they are celebrating the birth of Gor-Gor (Crack in the Egg). Band manager Sleazy P. Martini contacts Gwar, telling them to come to New York City to shoot a commercial for Gwar cereal, a cornflake-like food that is sprinkled with crack cocaine rather than sugar, turning kids into addicts (Have You Seen Me?).

As the Morality Squad prepares for their attack on Gwar, their religious representative, Father Bohab, is convicted of child molestation and sodomy of a twelve-year-old choirboy. Despite the clear evidence of Bohab's crimes, the Squad feel he was framed by Gwar (particularly Sleazy, who took part in exposing him); he is released and the charges are dropped. While Bohab is picketing against Gwar along with other protestors, Gwar and Sleazy brutally attack the crowd, culminating in the disembowelment of Bohab and him being sodomized with his own cross.

Gwar then travel to a nightclub, where they all become wasted on crack (The Road Behind). The next morning, the Cuttlefish of Cthulhu (having escaped the Morality Squad's grasp) reunites with a hungover Oderus, and warns them of the imminent attack by the Morality Squad. Gwar emerge victorious over the Morality Squad (The Morality Squad). Their victory is short-lived; Gor-Gor, having grown to monstrous size, arrives in New York and begins wreaking havoc. Rather than retreat, Gwar battles Gor-Gor in a titanic clash, resulting in the T-Rex's death (Gor-Gor). The final shot of the film reveals the Cuttlefish of Cthulhu happily reunited with Oderus amidst the rubble (Ham on the Bone).

Print status
Phallus in Wonderland was released on VHS in 1992, and DVD in 1999, but has been out of print in either format since 2002 (some sources give 1994 as the year for the VHS). Metal Blade and Slave Pit both carry the remaining VHS copies, and neither have the DVD. There is some confusion as to who actually owns the rights to this film, with Metal Blade saying that Slave Pit is the owner (and that they are in the re-negotiation process), and Slave Pit stating the opposite.

Because of this, copies of both have been hard to find, which has led to cases of people selling them for as much as $120.

On January 8, 2008, Metal Blade Records re-released the DVD. Special features include instant scene access, options to play songs only and curtain call. The DVDs come in a variety of colors, such as blue and black, and have a phallus etched onto them.

Director aliases
"Distortion Wells" is the pseudonym for Bill Morrison, who later directed the music video to "Saddam A Go-Go." "Judas Bullhorn" is Canadian director and musician Blair Dobson. Despite being nominated for a Grammy, neither were ever paid for months of work on the project, and Dobson, after initiating the project between his company and Slave Pit /Metal Blade, left halfway through shooting.
 
In the Bohab Central forums, Mike Bishop (who played Beefcake the Mighty at the time) claimed that this use of outside directors led to serious tension between himself (it was his doing) and Hunter Jackson (the founder of Slave Pit), and was a major factor in his departure the following year.

Cultural references
In the news report scene where Gor-Gor is approaching New York City, the exasperated newscaster pulls a gun out of an envelope and commits suicide on live television in a manner parodying that of R. Budd Dwyer.

Flattus Maximus
As with the album America Must Be Destroyed (upon which this film is based), Phallus in Wonderland does not have a distinct Flattus Maximus character. A friend of the band's, named "STRETCH," filled the role for the few scenes in which Flattus appears, and is killed in the "Gor-Gor" video.

Track listing
 "Crack in the Egg"
 "Have You Seen Me?"
 "The Road Behind"
 "The Morality Squad"
 "Gor-Gor"
 "Ham on the Bone" (credits)

References

Gwar video albums
1992 video albums
American musical films